Jane Lee Fox is a physicist known for her research on the atmosphere of planets including Mars and Venus.

Education and career 
Fox has a B.S. in chemistry from the University of Michigan (1973) and earned her Ph.D. in chemical physics from Harvard University in 1978. She was on the faculty at Stony Brook University from 1984 to 2003. Fox joined Wright State University in 2005, and as of 2021 is a research professor at Wright State University.

Research 
Fox is known for her research modeling the atmosphere on Mars, including details on nitrogen found in the Martian atmosphere. She has also worked on the atmosphere around Venus and examined hydrocarbons in atmosphere of Titan, one of the moon's of Saturn. Fox was a member of the science team for the Mars Atmosphere and Volatile Evolution (MAVEN) project where she studied long-term changes in Mars' atmosphere.

Selected publications

Awards and honors 
 Fellow, American Geophysical Union (2005)

References

External links 
 

Fellows of the American Geophysical Union
University of Michigan alumni
Harvard Graduate School of Arts and Sciences alumni
Wright State University faculty
Women physicists
Space scientists
Year of birth missing (living people)
Living people